A Dutch oven (not to be confused with masonry oven) is a thick-walled cooking pot with a tight-fitting lid. Dutch ovens are usually made of seasoned cast iron; however, some Dutch ovens are instead made of cast aluminium, or ceramic. Some metal varieties are enameled rather than being seasoned, and these are sometimes called French ovens. Dutch ovens have been used as cooking vessels for hundreds of years.

History

Early European history
During the 17th century, brass was the preferred metal for English cookware and domestic utensils, and the Dutch produced it at the lowest cost, which, however, was still expensive. In 1702, Abraham Darby was a partner in the Brass Works Company of Bristol, which made malt mills for breweries. Apparently in 1704, Darby visited the Netherlands, where he studied the Dutch methods of working brass, including the casting of brass pots. Darby learned that when making castings, the Dutch used molds made of sand, rather than the traditional loam and clay, and this innovation produced a finer finish on their brassware. In 1706 he started a new brass mill in the Baptist Mills section of Bristol. There, Darby realized that he could sell more kitchen wares if he could replace brass with a cheaper metal, namely, cast iron. Initial experiments to cast iron in sand molds were unsuccessful, but with the aid of one of his workers, James Thomas, a Welshman, he succeeded in casting iron cookware. In 1707 he obtained a patent for the process of casting iron in sand, which derived from the Dutch process. Thus, the term "Dutch oven" has endured for over 300 years, since at least 1710. The Merriam-Webster Dictionary and Researching Food History agree that several very different cooking devices were called "Dutch ovens" — a cast-iron pan with legs and a lid; a roughly rectangular box that was open on one side and that was used to roast meats, and a compartment in a brick hearth that was used for baking.

American history
American Dutch ovens changed over time during the colonial era. These changes included a shallower pot, legs to hold the oven above the coals, and a lid flange to keep the coals on the lid and out of the food. Paul Revere is credited with the design of the flat lid with a ridge for holding coals as well as the addition of legs to the pots.

Colonists and settlers valued cast-iron cookware because of its versatility and durability. Cooks used them to boil, bake, stew, fry, and roast. The ovens were so valuable that wills in the 18th and 19th centuries frequently spelled out the desired inheritor. For example, Mary Ball Washington (mother of President George Washington) specified in her will, dated 20 May 1788, that one-half of her "iron kitchen furniture" should go to her grandson, Fielding Lewis, and the other half to Betty Carter, a granddaughter. This bequest included several Dutch ovens.

Westward-bound settlers took Dutch ovens with them. A Dutch oven was among the gear Lewis and Clark carried when they explored the great American Northwest between 1804 and 1806. Mormon pioneers who settled the American West also took along their Dutch ovens. In fact, a statue raised to honor the Mormon handcart companies who entered Utah’s Salt Lake Valley in the 1850s proudly displays a Dutch oven hanging from the front of the handcart. The Dutch oven is also the official state cooking pot of Texas, Utah, and Arkansas.

Mountain men exploring the American frontier used Dutch ovens into the late 19th century. Chuckwagons accompanying western cattle drives also carried Dutch ovens from the mid-19th century into the early 20th century.

Dutch history

In the Netherlands, a Dutch oven is called a braadpan, which literally translates to roasting pan. Another name for it is sudderpan, which literally translates to "simmerpan" or "simmering pot". The design most used today is a black enameled steel pan that is suitable for gas and induction heating. The model was introduced in 1891 by BK, a well-known Dutch manufacturer of cookware. Cheaper and lighter in weight than cast iron, it proved to be a revolution in the kitchen. A braadpan is mainly used for frying meat only, but it can also be used for making traditional stews, such as hachée. Cast-iron models exist, but are used less frequently.

Types

Camping
A camping, cowboy, or chuckwagon Dutch oven usually has three integral legs, a wire bail handle, and a slightly concave, rimmed lid so that coals from the cooking fire can be placed on top as well as below. This provides more uniform internal heat and lets the inside act as an oven. A Dutch oven without integral legs can be used as a conventional pot on a stove, or may be set on a separate welded steel or cast iron tripod stand or on small stones when cooking on hot coals. These ovens are typically made of bare cast iron, although some are aluminium. The bail handle facilitates lifting the Dutch oven onto and off the coals, using a metal hook. Dutch ovens are often used in Scouting outdoor activities.

Bedourie oven

In Australia, a bedourie camp oven is a steel cookpot, shaped and used like a Dutch oven. Named after Bedourie, Queensland, the Bedourie ovens were developed as a more robust, non-breakable alternative to the cast-iron Dutch ovens.

Potjie

In South Africa, a potjie directly translated "pottle or little pot" from Afrikaans or Dutch, is unlike most other Dutch ovens, in that it is round-bottomed. Traditionally it is a single cast, cast-iron pot, reinforced with external double or triple circumscribing ribs, a bail handle for suspending the pot, and three short legs for resting the pot. It is similar in appearance to a cauldron. It has a matching handled lid, which is recessed, and convex to allow for hot coals to rest on top, providing additional heat from above. When the vessel is to be stored long term, care must be taken to avoid rust forming by seasoning. "Potjie" can also refer to the technique of cooking potjiekos. Among the recipes that require a potjie, there is one for a type of bread called "potbrood", which literally means "pot bread".

Among the South African indigenous peoples, specifically Zulus, these pots also became known as phutu pots, after a popular food prepared in it. The larger pots are normally used for large gatherings, e.g., funerals or weddings, to prepare large quantities of food. Wooden spoons called kombe in the Tsonga language are used for mixing and stirring.

This tradition originated in the Netherlands during the Siege of Leiden and was brought to South Africa by Dutch immigrants. It persisted over the years with the Voortrekkers and survives today as a traditional Afrikaner method of cooking. It is still in common use by South African campers, both domestic and international.

Chugunok
In Eastern Europe, but mostly in Russia, a chugunok is a cast-iron pot used in a modern oven or in a traditional Russian oven, hearth, or a campfire. A chugunok is used in a variety of cooking methods, including high temperature cooking, low-temperature cooking, thermal cooking, slow cooking, smothering, roasting, baking, braising, and stewing.

The shape of a chugunok is similar to a traditional crock with a narrow top and bottom and wider in the middle. When used inside a traditional oven, a long handled holding tool is used with a roller that serves as a lever to lift a heavy chugunok in and out of the oven. Since there are no handles, it's inconvenient to use a chugunok on a kitchen stove.

Often several chugunoks of different sizes are used in the oven at the same time to prepare the entire meal. Dishes usually cooked in a chugunok are roast meat with vegetables called "zharkoye", holubtsi, potato babka, stuffed peppers, and baked milk.

Use in cooking
Dutch ovens are well suited for long, slow cooking, such as in making roasts, stews, and casseroles. Virtually any recipe that can be cooked in a conventional oven can be cooked in a Dutch oven.

When cooking over a campfire, it is possible to use old-style lipped cast-iron Dutch ovens as true baking ovens, to prepare biscuits, cakes, breads, pizzas, and even pies. A smaller baking pan can be placed inside the ovens, used and replaced with another as the first batch is completed. It is also possible to stack Dutch ovens on top of each other, conserving the heat that would normally rise from the hot coals on the top. These stacks can be as high as five or six pots.

Seasoning and care

Bare cast iron
Traditionally  Dutch ovens are seasoned  like other cast-iron cookware.

After use Dutch ovens are typically cleaned like other cast-iron cookware: with boiling water, and a soft brush or sponge. Where possible, a cleaned and freshly oiled Dutch oven should be stored in a clean, dry location with the lid ajar or off to promote air circulation and to avoid the smell and taste of rancid oil. If the Dutch oven must be stored with the lid on, a paper towel or piece of newspaper should be placed inside the oven to absorb any moisture.

With care, after much use the surfaces of the Dutch oven will become dark black, very smooth, shiny and non-stick. With proper care, a Dutch oven will provide long service.

Enameled ovens
Enameled ovens do not need to be seasoned before use. However, they lose some of the other advantages of bare cast iron.

Enameled ovens can usually be cleaned like ordinary cookware, and some brands can be put in the dishwasher.

See also 
 List of cooking techniques
 List of cooking vessels
 Outdoor cooking

References

Further reading

External links 
 
 
 

Camping equipment
Cooking vessels
Scoutcraft
Ovens

fr:Cocotte (cuisine)